Arikesavanallur is a village in Ambasamuthiram Taluk, Tirunelveli district, Tamil Nadu, India. This village derives its name from the King Nindraseer Nedumaran who was also called as Harikesa.

This village is known for the Temple of Lord Shiva, Ariyanadaswamy Temple. This temple is more than 1100 years old.

References

Notable people 
 Muthiah Bhagavatar Carnatic music  composer
 Harikesanallur Venkataraman, Astrologer
 Rasulmansur MOHAMMED, Automotive Expert
 T. L. Venkatarama Iyer, Carnatic music musicologist, Supreme Court Judge

External links 
 Shiva Temple, Harikesanallur

Villages in Tirunelveli district